Eddie Williams (1932 - May 8, 2017) was President of the Joint Center for Political and Economic Studies from 1972 to 2004. During this time, he transformed it into the focal point of political thought and research within the black community along with the creation of an inventory of 10,000+ Black Elected Officials. Williams also helped with the creation of the National Coalition on Black Civic Participation. He founded Focus Magazine as a way to develop a space for black officials, activists, academics etc. throughout the country to work together.

Awards and recognition 
Williams has received several awards including:
 Congressional Black Caucus Adam Clayton Powell Award (1982)
 The MacArthur Foundation Fellowship (1988)
 Washingtonian of the Year Award (1991)
 National Black Caucus of State Legislators Nation Builder Award (1992)
 The Louis E. Martin Great American Award (2015)

National Journal political magazine once named Eddie N. Williams as one of the 150 people outside government who wield the greatest influence in Washington, D.C.

References

External links

1932 births
2017 deaths
African-American people in Washington, D.C., politics
African-American activists